Joseph-Henri Tabaret (12 April 1828 – 8 February 1886) was a French-born Roman Catholic Priest and academic, best known because of his long and important association with the University of Ottawa. He was a member of the Oblate Fathers of Mary Immaculate. The Oblates founded the College of Bytown in 1848. Under Tabaret's leadership from 1853–1861, Bytown College became an official university.

He was rector (president) of Collège d'Ottawa / College of Ottawa from 1861–1864, 1867-1874 and 1877–1886.
Rev. Joseph-Henri Tabaret, OMI, served the College for a total of 30 years during the 19th century, and is generally regarded as the builder of the University. Father Tabaret was an ardent defender of bilingualism, often heard to say: "...in this part of Canada, the use of both languages is not a matter of discussion; it is a matter of necessity."

References

External links 
 (http://www.omi.ca/) 
 (https://www.uottawa.ca/services/archives/eng/history.htm) 
 (http://www.president.uottawa.ca/past_rectors-e.php)
 (https://www.uottawa.ca/map/north/tbt.html)

1828 births
1886 deaths
19th-century Canadian Roman Catholic priests
Missionary Oblates of Mary Immaculate